Potato is a British television production company. It is a subsidiary of ITV Studios, established in March 2013.

Potato produces TV shows such as The Chase, Ninja Warrior UK and CelebAbility.

List of TV Programming

References

ITV (TV network)
Mass media companies established in 2013
Television production companies of the United Kingdom